Country risk refers to the risk of investing or lending in a country, arising from possible changes in the business environment that may adversely affect operating profits or the value of assets in the country. For example, financial factors such as currency controls, devaluation or regulatory changes, or stability factors such as mass riots, civil war and other potential events contribute to companies' operational risks. This term is also sometimes referred to as political risk; however, country risk is a more general term that generally refers only to risks influencing all companies operating within or involved with a particular country.

Political risk analysis providers and credit rating agencies use different methodologies to assess and rate countries' comparative risk exposure. Credit rating agencies tend to use quantitative econometric models and focus on financial analysis, whereas political risk providers tend to use qualitative methods, focusing on political analysis. However, there is no consensus on methodology in assessing credit and political risks.

Ratings 

The least-risky countries for investment. Ratings are further broken down into components including political risk, economic risk. Euromoney's quarterly country risk index “Country risk survey” monitors the political and economic stability of 185 sovereign countries. Results focus foremost on economics, specifically sovereign default risk and/or payment default risk for exporters (a.k.a. “trade credit” risk).

Partial list of credit risk rating agencies 
 Fitch Ratings (U.S.) 
 Moody's (U.S.) 
 Standard & Poor's (U.S.)
 CTRISKS (Greater China)

Partial list of political risk analysis organizations 
 Euromoney Country Risk, ECR
 IHS Country Risk
 BMI Research
 Country Risk Solutions
 Economist Intelligence Unit
 Eurasia Group
 Maplecroft
 Oxford Analytica
 The PRS Group, Inc.

See also 
 Credit rating agency
 National average salary
 Offshoring
 Workforce productivity

References

External links

Downloadable country analysis and reports 
 Coface Economic Studies
 Credendo Country Risk Ratings
 The Benche Analysis & Reports
 Euler Hermes Country Reports
 Maplecroft
 The PRS Group, Inc.

Financial economics
Business terms
Sovereign default